Bocula odontosema is a moth of the family Erebidae first described by Turner in 1909. It is found in the Australian state of Queensland and in New Guinea.

References

Rivulinae